Almeron and Olive Smith House is a historic home located at Plandome in Nassau County, New York.  It was built in 1907 and is a -story building with a cross-gabled, overhanging roof. It features a 1-story wraparound porch and has elements of Colonial Revival design. Also on the property is a contributing garage.  It was one of the first residences built on lands developed by the Plandome Land Company.

It was listed on the National Register of Historic Places in 2006.

References

Houses on the National Register of Historic Places in New York (state)
Colonial Revival architecture in New York (state)
Houses completed in 1907
Houses in Nassau County, New York
National Register of Historic Places in Nassau County, New York